Springer is the 2003 debut EP by the Danish group Efterklang. They self-released it on their Rumraket label in 2003, employing the do-it-yourself aesthetic by making 500 copies packaged in fake white fur. It was later released worldwide by The Leaf Label in April 2005.

Track listing
 "Kloy Gyn"  – 8:01
 "Antitech"  – 7:21
 "Redrop"  – 4:08
 "Bright"  – 6:01
 "Filmosonic XL"  – 6:12

External links
efterklang.net – Efterklang's official website

Efterklang albums